Thierry Loder (born 15 December 1975 in Geneva) is a Swiss-born French former cyclist.

Major results
1995
 1st Tour du Lac Léman
1998
 3rd Overall Tour de l'Avenir
2000
 2nd Overall Tour de l'Ain
 9th Overall Tour de l'Avenir
2001
 5th Overall Giro della Provincia di Lucca
2004
 2nd Overall Tour des Pyrénées
1st Points classification
 10th Tour du Lac Léman

Grand Tour general classification results timeline

References

1975 births
Living people
French male cyclists
Cyclists from Geneva